Keramettin is a village in the Süloğlu District of Edirne Province in Turkey.

References

Villages in Süloğlu District